Umm Salal (also spelled Umm Slal) is a municipality in the State of Qatar.

It contains several historic places, such as Barzan Tower. The municipal headquarters Umm Salal is located in Umm Salal Ali, about 10 km from the coast and 15 km north of Doha, the Qatari capital.

Etymology

The first word of Umm Salal is Arabic for "mother", while salal refers to large rocks or stones. Hence, the area's name translates literally to "mother of rocks". It was named for the numerous rock formations found in the area.

History
As a municipality, Umm Salal was established in 1972, alongside Qatar's 4 other initial municipalities. On 29 November 1974, the municipal headquarters was inaugurated under the supervision of Mohammad bin Jaber Al Thani, a former minister of the Municipality and Urban Planning, alongside Abdulaziz Al-Ghanem, who was Umm Salal's municipal council representative.

Abdullah bin Ahmed Al Thani served as the first head of the municipal council. As of 2017, Rashid Ahmed Al-Kaabi is the mayor of Umm Salal Municipality.

Geography
Umm Salal shares land borders with Doha to the southeast, Al Rayyan to the south, Al-Shahaniya to the west, Al Khor to the north, and Al Daayen to the east. It does not have a coastline. Occupying roughly 2.7% of Qatar's territory, the municipality is relatively small in size. Its landscape consists of many open spaces and rock formations.

The northern portion of the municipality is largely agricultural due to the presence of a large aquifer, and it accommodates a number of small villages and farms. Saina Al-Humaidi, found at a distance of 5 km north of Umm Salal Ali, is the main urban settlement located in the north. Government land grants have expanded the boundaries of Saina Al-Humaidi in recent years, and it is being developed as a residential center for the nearby rural communities.

In the municipality's southern portion, Umm Salal Mohammed constitutes part of Metropolitan Doha. Slightly to the north is Umm Salal Ali, which is also considered to be within Metropolitan Doha's boundaries, albeit to a much lesser extent. These two towns have fueled a large part of the municipality's southern growth.

Umm Salal's eastern and western segments are divided by the path of the national utilities corridor. Desert mainly dominates the western section, and it has few settlements. The eastern section is highly urbanized and is adjacent to Al Shamal Road.

According to the Ministry of Municipality and Environment (MME), the municipality accommodates 21 rawdas, 10 wadis, 20 jeris (places where water flows), and three hills.

Administrative divisions
The municipality is divided into one zone which is then divided into 355 blocks.

Administrative zones

The following zone was recorded in the 2015 population census:

Districts
Other settlements in Umm Salal include:

Abu Thaylah
Al Froosh
Al Mazrouah
Jeri Al Samir
Jeri Khabbab
Muaither Al Dasem
Muaither Al Meshaf
Rawdat Al `Ajuz
Umm Shaharain
Wadi Al Askar
Wadi Al Waab

Economy
As of 2017, most of the industry that takes place within Umm Salal's boundaries is centered on construction, at 3,200 employees, with agriculture coming second at 2,000 employees, and retail and services trades in third, numbering 1,500 employees. A vast majority of the municipality's inhabitants work outside the municipality.

Retail

Qatar's largest mall, Doha Festival City, was partially opened in Umm Salal Mohammed in April 2017. Valued at QR 6.4 billion, the mall will eventually have 540 retail stores covering an area of 244,000 square meters. IKEA was the first store to be commissioned in Doha Festival City, opening its doors in March 2013.

Heavy industries
In recent years, heavy industry companies have set up in or relocated from Doha Industrial Area to Umm Salal. Factors that account for this pattern involve the finer condition of the roads, fewer transportation costs and more affordable renting of industrial buildings. It was reported that several metal fabrication and steelworks factories were being planned in 2016.

Logistics
Major logistics centers have been set up in the south-central Umm Salal. In 2015, a QAR 133 million logistics area in Jeri Al Samir was announced by the Ministry of Economy and Trade. The area allocated for the logistics center was 74,180 square meters, and it had an estimated completion date of early 2017.

Barwa Group embarked on a QAR 395 million warehouse complex project, due to be completed in 2017, with an area 259,446 square meters in Umm Shahrayn, next to Jeri Al Samur.

Agriculture

Agriculture plays an important role in Umm Salal's rural areas. Roughly 11% of Qatar's total farmland was found in Umm Salal in 2015, ranking third of Qatar's seven municipalities. There were 161 farms spread over 5,044 hectares, with roughly half (80) being involved in growing crops and the other half (78) being split between crops and livestock. The municipality had a livestock inventory of 41,870, the majority of which were sheep (23,607).

The majority of farms are concentrated to the east of Umm Salal Ali and in the north near Saina Al-Humaidi. Al Sulaiteen Agricultural Complex is headquartered in Umm Salal Ali. Consisting of 40 hectares of cultivable land owned by Abdullah Salem al-Sulaiteen, up to 300 tonnes of fresh produce is shipped from the farm annually. Desalination plants are also located onsite.

Transportation

Movement into and out of the municipality is mainly facilitated by Al Shamal Road, which is on the eastern fringes, close to Al Daayen. Celebration Highway is the other major highway in Umm Salal, and connects to Dukhan Highway as well as to Al Rayyan Municipality. Public transport is poor and characterized by a lack of bus services and bus stops.

In the future, Doha Metro's Green Line will connect Doha to Umm Salal via rail. Tram stations will be located in Al Kharaitiyat, Umm Salal Mohammed, and Umm Salal Ali, the latter station being the northernmost extension of the rail network in the municipality.

Infrastructure

A comprehensive plan and vision released by the municipality in December 2017 outlined the Umm Salal Mohammed area as being developed as the region's administrative seat and economic hub, and Izghawa, Umm Salal Ali and Al Kharaitiyat undergoing developments to become major mixed-use residential areas.

In the southwest of the municipality, the North Gate Mixed Use development project is underway. Close to Qatar's major population centers, North Gate is planned to have 98,000 square meters dedicated to retail space, 64,000 square meters for office space and over 400 housing units and apartments.

In Umm Salal Ali, a massive sewer treatment facility was constructed at a cost of QAR 3.63 billion and became fully functional in February 2016. It has the capacity to process 245,000 cubic meters of sewage daily.

Education

According to the 2016 education census, sixteen public schools operated in Umm Salal at the time. Half of the schools were exclusively for girls and the other half were reserved for boys. Female students numbered at 3,814, outnumbering the 3,549 male students.

A number of private international schools also have a presence in Umm Salal, such as the Royal Grammar School, Guildford, which is based in Umm Salal Mohammed and which opened to students in September 2016, in addition to the Qatar Finland International School and the International School of London Qatar, which are also based in Umm Salal Mohammed.

Healthcare

The first primary healthcare facility to operate within Umm Salal was located in Umm Salal Ali. In July 2016, Umm Salal Health Centre opened in Bu Fasseela, spread out over an area exceeding 50,000 square meters. This inauguration came after 2.5 years of construction at a cost of QR 115 million. With the stated goal of serving a population of up to 50,000, the facility has 64 clinics, which is more than all other health care centers in Qatar.

Six pharmacies were recorded in the municipality in 2013 by Qatar's Supreme Council of Health.

Sports

There are two sports clubs based in the municipality: Umm Salal SC, based in Umm Salal Ali, and Al-Kharaitiyat SC in Al Kharaitiyat. Both clubs field teams in Qatar's premier football league, the Qatar Stars League. Furthermore, Umm Salal Ali also accommodates Barzan Youth Center as well as Barzan Olympic Park.

In Umm Salal Mohammed, the Umm Salal Stadium is being constructed as a venue for the 2022 FIFA World Cup. It is being designed by Albert Speer & Partner GmbH. The stadium will be able to support 45,120 fans. It is being modeled after traditional Arabian forts. After the 2022 World Cup, the stadium will decrease its capacity to 25,500 seats and it will be used by Umm Salal SC as their home ground.

Visitor attractions

Landmarks and heritage sites

Barzan Towers are located in Umm Salal Mohammed. The towers were built in the late 19th century and were renovated by Sheikh Mohammed bin Jassim Al Thani in the early 20th century to serve as guard posts for water sources and to observe the new moon during Ramadan. A third major fort can also be found in the municipality: the former palace of Jassim bin Muhammed bin Jassim Al Thani.

The grave of another member of the royal family and a former governor, Ahmed bin Muhammed Al Thani, is also a notable attraction located in the municipality.

A division of Umm Salal Mohammed is being sectioned off as a heritage quarter. This quarter will feature traditional Qatari architecture and neighborhoods (known as 'fareej'), and will have safeguards in place to ensure they are preserved in their original state.

Parks
Overall, five parks are located in the municipality as of June 2018. In December 2014, municipal authorities unveiled Umm Salal Park near Barzan Towers in Umm Salal Mohammed. The park will serve the entire central region of Umm Salal. Spread over an area of 12,272 square meters, Umm Salal Park is equipped with a footpath, children's play area, landscaped plants, a cafeteria, and a prayer area. During the same period, a park south of Umm Salal Mohammed in Al Kharaitiyat was opened. Intended to serve the southern regions of Al Kharaitiyat and Izghawa, the park is set over a 2,094 square meter area. Two other parks also exist in this area, with Izghawa hosting the massive 14,000 square meter Izghawa Park and another park in Al Kharaitiyat which occupies 5,836 square meters.

The Mohamed bin Jassim Park became the second park in Umm Salal Mohammed to open in May 2017. It spans an area of 5,988 square meters and features a cafeteria, children's play area and 13 different species of plants.

Protected areas

Three protected environmental areas are found in the municipality. The first, Sunai, is 4 square kilometers and is situated to the north of Umm Al Amad. It was given legal protection to preserve its biodiversity and to prevent the negative effects of urbanization. The second area is Umm Al Amad reserve, which spans 5.72 square kilometers and is typified by its abundance of vegetation. Finally, Wadi Sultan occupies an area of 1 square kilometers and is west of Al Kharaitiyat.

It was announced in late 2016 that the largest-ever human-made forest will be established next to the sewage treatment plant in Umm Salal Ali. Set to span 8.3 square kilometers, the forest will contain close to 100,000 trees. Treated water from the plant will be used to irrigate the forest. Combined costs of sewage treatment plant and the forest are close to $3.65 billion.

Demographics

As of the 2015 population census, Umm Salal's population stood at 90,835. Municipal officials estimated that the population would increase to 104,100 by 2017 as a result of an influx of migrant workers before decreasing by 2032. Most of the growth is expected to happen near the border with Doha Municipality.

In 2010, males accounted for 60.7% of the population while females made up 39.3% of the population. The overall literacy rate was 95.9%. Age-wise, 22.2% of the population was under 15 and the remaining 77.8% was above the age of 15.

The following table is a breakdown of registered live births by nationality and sex for Umm Salal. Places of birth are based on the home municipality of the mother at birth.

References

 
Municipalities of Qatar